"Stumblin' In" is a song written by Mike Chapman and Nicky Chinn, performed by Chris Norman and Suzi Quatro. Originally released as a standalone single, it was later added to some editions of the Quatro album If You Knew Suzi... It was Norman's first single as a solo artist.

Background
The writing-producing team of Mike Chapman and Nicky Chinn were behind many of the 1970s hits for Suzi Quatro and for Chris Norman’s band Smokie. In 1978, Chapman, Chinn, Quatro, and the members of Smokie were all at a party in Düsseldorf. As Chapman recounted, "Suzi was playing bass, and Chris was there with his arm round her, and they were singing into a mike, and I thought what a fantastic duet they’d make, because they looked so great together. The next day, I was in the studio with Suzi, and during a break, I came up with the line, 'Our love is alive'…I looked at Suzi and said 'What about this, with you and Chris? Wouldn’t it be great?' and she said it sounded fantastic.”

Chart performance
The single peaked at number four on the Billboard Hot 100 in 1979. The song was Quatro's only U.S. top 40 hit and Norman's lone U.S. charting effort apart from his time with the band Smokie (where they charted three times while Norman was still a member). In the UK, where the song was also Norman's only chart hit as a solo artist, the disc hit the listing on 11 November 1978 and peaked at number 41 with eight weeks on the chart. It reached No. 11 on the Canada RPM Chart, but went to No. 1 on the Canada Adult Contemporary Chart.

Use in media
In 2021, the song was used in the Paul Thomas Anderson film, Licorice Pizza. A year later, in 2022, "Stumblin' In" was featured in episode 3 of the Netflix drama Dahmer – Monster: The Jeffrey Dahmer Story.

Personnel
Suzi Quatro – lead vocals, bass
Chris Norman – lead vocals, guitar
Len Tuckey – guitar
Dave Neal – drums
Mike Deacon – keyboards, electric piano

Charts

Weekly charts

Year-end charts

Release history

Film soundtrack albums
Polle Fiction: Original Soundtrack (2002).

 - Original Soundtrack (2008).

Red Dog - Original Soundtrack (2011).

Licorice Pizza - Original Motion Picture Soundtrack (2021).

Cover versions
Namibian singer Nianell and South African singer Dozi recorded a version in 2009 on their cover duets album It Takes Two.

In 1979, Al Bano and Romina Power made a cover version in French under the title "Et je suis à toì". German singers Bernd Clüver and Marion Maerz recorded a German version in the same year under the title "Schau mal herein (die Tasse Kaffee)".
There is also a Hungarian version under the title "A szerelem él" recorded by Csuka Mónika and Korda György with the "Express Együttes" in 1982.
Gry Meilstrup and Bernd Vonficht recorded a cover on their 1989 album Moments in Love as Bo Andersen and Bernie Gold.

In 1986, a Chinese version of the song entitled 埋葬爱情 was recorded as a duet by Taiwanese singer 方文琳 and Malaysian-born Singapore singer 巫启贤.

In 2010,the Bulgarian alternative and ska rock band Svetlio & the Legends recorded a cover of the song, entitled "Боли ме гъза" (Boli me guza/ My ass hurts) .

References

External links
 , film of a promotional photoshoot for the Red Dog movie, on the SUZI QUATRO OFFICIAL YouTube channel. Features the song "Stumblin' In" prominently.

1978 songs
1978 debut singles
1979 singles
Suzi Quatro songs
Chris Norman songs
Male–female vocal duets
Songs written by Nicky Chinn
Songs written by Mike Chapman
Song recordings produced by Mike Chapman
RSO Records singles